Udedh Bun (English title: Unravel) is award-winning short Bhojpuri film released in 2008 directed by Siddharth Sinha. The 21-minute diploma film by Siddharth Sinha, a Film and Television Institute of India (FTII), Pune graduate, was selected for world premiere at the Berlin International Film Festival, where it won the Silver Bear for Best Short Film at the 2008 Berlin International Film Festival, first ever such award in the history of Bhojpuri cinema. Later it won the National Film Award for Best Short fiction Film.

Cast 
 Alok Rajwade as Ashu 
 Swati Sen
 Jaswant Singh
 Shubhangi Damle as Mother

Crew 
 Sound : Alok Tiwari

Awards

See also 
 Bhojpuri Film Industry
 List of Bhojpuri films

References

External links
 

2008 films
2000s Bhojpuri-language films
Indian coming-of-age films
Indian short films
2008 directorial debut films
2000s coming-of-age films
2008 short films